Querida may refer to:

Carmen Querida, Venezuelan telenovela on Radio Caracas Televisión
Querida, Colorado, ghost town in Custer County, Colorado, United States
Querida Enemiga, a telenovela distributed by Televisa
"Querida", a song by Juan Gabriel from Recuerdos, Vol. II

See also
"Asturias, patria querida", the anthem of the Spanish autonomous community of Asturias
Mi querida señorita, a 1972 Spanish film directed by Jaime de Armiñán; a black comedy on the subject of sex change